The , (FEPC), is an industry organization of electric utilities in Japan.  Its objective is to harmonize the plans for electric development in Japan.  Its main offices are located in Chiyoda, Tokyo.

History 
 November 1952: Founded by a group of 9 electric power companies (Hokkaido, Tohoku, Tokyo, Chubu, Hokuriku, Kansai, Chukoku, Kyushu)
 March 2000: The Okinawa Electric Power Company joined.

See also 
 Energy in Japan
 Nuclear power in Japan

External links 
 

Nuclear power companies of Japan
Electric power companies of Japan
Electric
Organizations based in Tokyo